Sinoe chambersi is a moth of the family Gelechiidae. It is found in North America, where it has been recorded from the United States (from Pennsylvania to Mississippi and in California) and from Canada (from Alberta to Quebec).

The wingspan is 11.4−11.6 mm. The forewings range from dark grey to brown, with a dark brown subbasal fascia and a brown basal patch. There are two dark brown spots on the costa and the discal cell has a dark brown median streak. The apical area has a black median streak beyond the discal cell and there is a dark brown spot at two-thirds of the dorsum. The hindwings are light grey or brown. Adults are on wing from January to March in the south and from March to June in the north.

Etymology
The species is named for Vactor Tousey Chambers.

References

Moths described in 2012
Litini